Mickey's Steam Roller is a 1934 animated short film produced by Walt Disney Productions and released by United Artists. In the cartoon, Mickey Mouse is the driver of a steamroller which is hijacked by his two nephews. It was directed by David Hand and features the voices of Walt Disney as Mickey and Marcellite Garner as Minnie Mouse and Mickey's nephews. It was the 67th Mickey Mouse short film to be released, and the fifth of that year.

Although this is the third animated appearance of Mickey's nephews, it is the first to show only two of them. The film is therefore considered the first identifiable and most significant animated appearance of Morty and Ferdie Fieldmouse, Mickey's twin nephews from the Mickey Mouse comic strip.

The film was also called The Steamroller during production, and Mickey's Steamroller upon its re-release. Disney archivist Dave Smith has also stylized the title as Mickey's Steam-Roller.

Plot
Mickey Mouse drives an anthropomorphic steamroller while a group of dogface workmen perform road maintenance. Meanwhile, Minnie Mouse appears as the nanny of a young Morty and Ferdie Fieldmouse, pushing them in a stroller and singing "Pease Porridge Hot". Mickey drives by and they wave at him. Mickey stops and gives the boys a ride with the steamroller by attaching the vehicle's tow rope to their stroller.

After this, Mickey flirts with Minnie by giving her some Sweethearts candy and tries to steal a kiss. While they are distracted, Morty and Ferdie climb onto Mickey's steamroller and drive it away. Mickey frantically runs after the nephews, but when he attempts to cut them off, he finds himself being chased instead.

The nephews go on to cause extensive damage with the steamroller. Finally they chase Mickey into a multistory hotel, destroying the entire building except for the bathtub on each floor, each with a current bather. Unhurt in the rubble, Mickey laughs as Morty and Ferdie see-saw on a board balanced on his head.

Voice cast
 Mickey Mouse: Walt Disney
 Minnie Mouse: Marcellite Garner
 Mickey's Nephews: Beatrice Hagen And Jayne Shadduck

Releases
1934 Theatrical release
1955 The Mickey Mouse Club (TV)
1997 Ink & Paint Club, episode 23 "The 'Other' Mice" (TV)

Home media
The short was released on December 7, 2004 on Walt Disney Treasures: Mickey Mouse in Black and White, Volume Two: 1929-1935.

Additional releases include:
2007 "Vintage Mickey" (DVD)

See also
Mickey's Choo-Choo
Mickey Mouse (film series)

References

External links

Mickey's Steamroller at the Big Cartoon DataBase
Mickey's Steamroller at The Encyclopedia of Disney Animated Shorts

1930s Disney animated short films
1934 films
Mickey Mouse short films
1934 animated films
Films directed by David Hand
Films produced by Walt Disney
Films about hijackings
American black-and-white films
1930s American films